Hasanabad-e Deh Gavi (also Romanized as Ḩasanābād-e Deh Gāvī; also known as Ḩasanābād) is a village in Chahdegal Rural District, Negin Kavir District, Fahraj County, Kerman Province, Iran. At the 2006 census, its population was 24, in 7 families.

References 

Populated places in Fahraj County